Hrobčice is a municipality and village in Teplice District in the Ústí nad Labem Region of the Czech Republic. It has about 1,100 inhabitants.

Administrative parts
Villages of Červený Újezd, Chouč, Kučlín, Mirošovice, Mrzlice, Mukov, Razice and Tvrdín are administrative parts of Hrobčice.

References

Villages in Teplice District